The Faculdades Integradas Rio Branco is a Brazilian private institution of higher education, nestled at São Paulo's neighborhood of Lapa. It has appeared as an initiative from the Fundação de Rotarianos de São Paulo - a non-profit entity that promotes the sponsoring of education, created in 1946 by associates of the Rotary Club of São Paulo.

Undergraduate degrees 

Bachelor of Business Administration
Bachelor in Economics
Bachelor of Laws
Publishing
Journalism
Linguistics - Translation and Interpreting
Pedagogy
Advertising
Design
Radio & TV
Bachelor in International Relations
Public Relations
Information System
Tourism

MBA & post-graduate degrees 

MBA Branding
Post-graduation - Creative Managing
Post-graduation - Business Managing
Post-graduation - Finances Managing
Post-graduation - Marketing Managing
Post-graduation - Human Resources Managing
Post-graduation - International Environmental Law
Post-graduation - Corporate Social responsibility

Achievements 
The school's International Relations undergraduate program is in 3rd place in the national rankings.

The Faculdades Integradas Rio Branco has been classified among the eight best Institutions of Higher Education of São Paulo, according to the results obtained in the Enade (National Examination of Students Development) in 2006.

The best grade in Brazil in Publishing, in 2006, was earned by an alumnus of the Faculdades Integradas Rio Branco.

Notable alumni 
 Álvaro de Miranda Neto (born 1973), Brazilian Olympic-class show jumping rider.

References

External links 
Faculdades Integradas Rio Branco
Fundação de Rotarianos de São Paulo

Universities and colleges in São Paulo (state)
Rotary International
Educational institutions established in 2001
2001 establishments in Brazil